The Belgian Grand Prix is a Formula One motor race.

Belgian Grand Prix may also refer to:

Belgian Grand Prix contains links to articles for the annual race in each year
Belgian motorcycle Grand Prix

See also